The largemouth yellowfish or Vaal-Orange largemouth yellowfish (Labeobarbus kimberleyensis) is a ray-finned fish species in the family Cyprinidae. This large freshwater barb is found in southern Africa.

It has long been placed in Barbus, the "wastebin genus" for barbs, by default; however, the species is increasingly being restored to related yellowfish genus Labeobarbus which seems a much more appropriate placement. It is probably hexaploid like the other yellowfish. L. kimberleyensis shares mtDNA haplotypes with the sympatric smallmouth yellowfish (L. aeneus), but is morphologically distinct. This typically indicates either species that have recently diverged, or hybrid introgression, or morphs that are mistakenly considered distinct species. The latter does not seem likely in this case, as the two differ much in size alone, but the actual cause for the genetic similarity remains unstudied.

Distribution and ecology
The largemouth yellowfish occurs in the Orange and Vaal Rivers and their larger tributaries (e.g. the Riet River) in Lesotho, Namibia and South Africa. In the latter country, it is found in Eastern Cape Province, Free State, Gauteng, Mpumalanga, North-West Province and Northern Cape Province.

L. kimberleyensis is predominantly found in deep pools (deeper than 2 metres/yards) of large rivers, as well as in the slow-moving water before weirs and river dams (e.g., Sterkfontein Dam). Abundant water weeds, overhanging riparian vegetation and other forms of plant cover seem to be essential for its well-being. They are predators of aquatic large invertebrates and small invertebrates; adults feed almost exclusively on fish. Spawning occurs in riffles during summer (around December/January); a large female can lay more than 60,000 eggs. They are slow-growing and long-lived and reach a total length of  only after five years.

Status and conservation
Compared to some of its relatives, the stocks of the largemouth yellowfish are still relatively healthy and it is not considered a threatened species. It is listed as Near Threatened by the ICZN though, as many ecosystems in which it occurs are severely degraded, and if this does not change, it probably cannot maintain viable populations for long. In the lower Orange River, considerable numbers are still found. Damming may cut off local populations from spawning sites. The Vaal River is highly laden with pollutants from sewage outside the wet season, and fish kills have been reported due to this. As it is an apex predator, its population density cannot be high. It is popular with anglers and theoretically a valuable food species, but it is recommended to catch and release it until the water quality is improved – for one thing, catching them for food may deplete local stocks to the point of extinction, for another, as an apex predator it accumulates toxins and may not be safe to eat. Whether significant introgression with the smallmouth yellowfish  (Labeobarbus aeneus) occurs and yields less viable hybrid offspring (which would also serve to decrease its stocks) needs to be determined.

L. kimberleyensis is found in the Augrabies Falls and Richtersveld National Parks. Anglers are being educated about this flagship species and encouraged to practice catch and release, which is mandatory in Free State. The species has also been successfully transplanted to dams within its range that have nearby shallow-water regions for spawning.

Footnotes

References
  (2007): Evolutionary origin of Lake Tana's (Ethiopia) small Barbus species: indications of rapid ecological divergence and speciation. Anim. Biol. 57(1): 39-48.  (HTML abstract)

External links
 How to identify yellowfish in South Africa

Labeobarbus
Freshwater fish of South Africa
Fish described in 1913
Taxa named by John Dow Fisher Gilchrist
Taxa named by William Wardlaw Thompson
Taxonomy articles created by Polbot